Ancient vessel may refer to:
Amphora, an ancient crockery, a kind of vase
Trireme, an ancient ship